Hamilton is a city in Marion County, Iowa, United States. The population was 119 at the time of the 2020 census.

Geography
Hamilton is located at  (41.170926, -92.903948).

Demographics

2010 census
As of the census of 2010, there were 130 people, 49 households, and 36 families living in the city. The racial makeup of the city was 100.0% White. Hispanic or Latino of any race were 1.5% of the population.

There were 49 households, of which 38.8% had children under the age of 18 living with them, 40.8% were married couples living together, 22.4% had a female householder with no husband present, 10.2% had a male householder with no wife present, and 26.5% were non-families. 24.5% of all households were made up of individuals, and 12.3% had someone living alone who was 65 years of age or older. The average household size was 2.65 and the average family size was 2.97.

The median age in the city was 39.5 years. 24.6% of residents were under the age of 18; 9.4% were between the ages of 18 and 24; 26.2% were from 25 to 44; 28.4% were from 45 to 64; and 11.5% were 65 years of age or older. The gender makeup of the city was 52.3% male and 47.7% female.

2000 census
As of the census of 2000, there were 144 people, 53 households, and 36 families living in the city. The racial makeup of the city was 97.92% White, 0.69% African American, 0.69% Native American, and 0.69% from two or more races.

There were 53 households, out of which 32.1% had children under the age of 18 living with them, 54.7% were married couples living together, 9.4% had a female householder with no husband present, and 30.2% were non-families. 28.3% of all households were made up of individuals, and 18.9% had someone living alone who was 65 years of age or older. The average household size was 2.72 and the average family size was 3.38.

In the city, the population was spread out, with 29.2% under the age of 18, 7.6% from 18 to 24, 31.3% from 25 to 44, 18.1% from 45 to 64, and 13.9% who were 65 years of age or older. The median age was 36 years. For every 100 females, there were 114.9 males. For every 100 females age 18 and over, there were 117.0 males.

The median income for a household in the city was $37,083, and the median income for a family was $46,250. Males had a median income of $29,375 versus $30,000 for females. The per capita income for the city was $42,935. There were 5.1% of families and 10.5% of the population living below the poverty line, including 9.1% of under eighteens and 11.1% of those over 64.

Education
The Twin Cedars Community School District operates local public schools.

References

Cities in Iowa
Cities in Marion County, Iowa